The Devon Coast to Coast Cycle Route is a 99-mile waymarked route from Ilfracombe in north Devon to Plymouth in south Devon. It skirts the National Parks of both Exmoor and Dartmoor and incorporates part of the Tarka Trail in the north, The Granite Way from Okehampton to Lydford and Drake's Trail from Tavistock to Plymouth.

Created by Sustrans, the sustainable travel charity, the cycleway runs for over half its length on off-road routes along disused railway lines. The route is part of the National Cycle Network and is designated National Cycle Route 27.

Towns that can be visited along the way include Tavistock, Okehampton, Bideford and Barnstaple.

The route is normally cycled in two or three days.

Route info
Section 1: Ilfracombe to Bideford. Distance:  - the section between Ilfracombe and Barnstaple follows the route of the former railway between Ilfracombe and the former Woolacombe & Mortehoe railway station and again between Braunton and Barnstaple train station. .
Section 2: Bideford to Okehampton. Distance: 
Section 3: Okehampton to Tavistock. Distance: 
Section 4: Tavistock to Plymouth. Distance:  - Drake's Trail. This section follows the route of the former South Devon and Tavistock Railway and incorporates Plymbridge Woods
Distances are approximate.

References

External links
Outline map of the route
Sustrans map of route 27

Cycleways in England
National Cycle Routes